Diaphanos huberi is a butterfly in the family Nymphalidae. It is found in Venezuela.

References

Butterflies described in 1981
Satyrini